Purav Raja and Ramkumar Ramanathan were the defending champions but only Raja chose to defend his title, partnering Petr Nouza. Raja lost in the quarterfinals to Anirudh Chandrasekar and Vijay Sundar Prashanth.

Chandrasekar and Prashanth won the title after defeating Toshihide Matsui and Kaito Uesugi 6–1, 4–6, [10–3] in the final.

Seeds

Draw

References

External links
 Main draw

Pune Challenger - Doubles
2023 Doubles